Alexeyevka is a rural locality (a village) in Bizhbulyaksky Selsoviet, Bizhbulyaksky District, Bashkortostan, Russia. The population was 303 as of 2010.

Geography 
It is located 30 km from Bizhbulyak.

References 

Rural localities in Bizhbulyaksky District